Randy A. Schobinger (born December 15, 1969) is an American politician serving as a member of the North Dakota House of Representatives from the 40th district. Elected in November 2016, he assumed office on December 1, 2016.

Early life and education 
Schobinger was born and raised in Minot, North Dakota. He earned a Bachelor of Science degree in economics from Minot State University.

Career 
Outside of politics, Schobinger works in the insurance industry. He was a candidate for North Dakota state treasurer in 2000, losing narrowly to Kathi Gilmore. He served as a member of the North Dakota Senate from 1995 to 2006. He was elected to the North Dakota House of Representatives in November 2016 and assumed office on December 1, 2016.

References 

1969 births
Living people
People from Minot, North Dakota
Minot State University alumni
Republican Party members of the North Dakota House of Representatives
Republican Party North Dakota state senators